Sealdah–Anand Vihar Terminal Express is an Express train belonging to Eastern Railway zone of Indian Railways  that run between  and  in India.

Background
It was done after the service of Lal Quila Express was ended and the passengers of Delhi was also increased for direct connectivity to Kolkata.

Service
The frequency of this train is bi-weekly and covers the distance of 1634 km with an average speed of 42 km/h with a total time of 37hr 50 min . Now the train has standard LCF rakes with max speed of 110 kmph. The train consists of 17 coaches:

2 AC III Tier
6 Sleeper Coaches
5 General
2 Seating cum Luggage Rake
1 Railway Mail Service
1 Parcel van

Routes

Traction
As the route is partially electrified a WDM-3A loco pulls the train to its destination on both sides.

External links
 13119 Sealdah - Anand Vihar (T) Express
 13120 Anand Vihar (T) - Sealdah Express

References

Express trains in India
Delhi–Kolkata trains
Rail transport in Jharkhand
Rail transport in Bihar
Rail transport in Uttar Pradesh